Mr. Mom is a 1983 American comedy film.

Mister Mom or variation, may also refer to:

 "Mr. Mom" (song), by Lonestar, 2004
 "Mr. Mom", a 2008 TV episode of Kate Plus 8
 "Mister Mom", a 2010 TV episode of Dog the Bounty Hunter that marked the return of Tim Chapman
 Mister Mama, a South Korean film of 1992

See also

 Mister (disambiguation)
 Mom (disambiguation)
 Stay-at-home dad
 Single parent
 Working parent
 "Mr. Mom/Mrs. Superstar", a 2010 TV episode of The Family Crews
 Meet Mister Mom a TV3 program in Norway